Langoat is a commune in the Côtes-d'Armor department of Brittany in northwestern France.

Population

Inhabitants of Langoat are called langoatais in French.

History
The local church was founded by Saint Pompeia in the 6th century.

See also
Communes of the Côtes-d'Armor department

References

External links

Communes of Côtes-d'Armor